The Most Illustrious Order of Queen Sālote Tupou III is a knighthood order of the Kingdom of Tonga.

History 
The Order was established on 28 June 2008 by His Late Majesty  King George Tupou V to commemorate the grand figure of his grandmother, Queen Sālote Tupou III, who, during the nearly fifty years of her government (5 April 1918 – 16 December 1965), had guided the state of Tonga to a substantial economical and social evolution.

The Order has been created as the principal civil reward for meritorious personal services to the sovereign. Above all, it is awarded as a Family Order for Tongan & foreign Royal Families.

Classes
The Order consists of four classes:
 Knight Grand Cross with Collar (KGCCQS)  - Collar, Star, Sash, Miniature & Rosette
 Knight/Dame Grand Cross (K/D GCQS) - Sash, Star, Miniature & Rosette
 Knight/Dame Commander (K/D CQS) - Necklet badge from a ribbon, Miniature & Rosette
 Member (MQS) - Breast badge from a ribbon, Miniature & Rosette

Insignia 
The ribbon for the two upper classes is a 102mm sky-blue-ultramarine Sash  (Ladies Sash approx. 74mm)

Knight Grand Cross 
 The Collar is a double gold chain, the centre-piece looks like being a gold knot, tied with a ribbon in the base (also gold). Moving upwards from the centre-piece on either side, a gold dove with its wings displayed and turned slightly towards the centre, alternating with the golden knot of the centre-piece. The Collar Badge is a deep-blue enamelled Maltese cross with a white edge, between each arm is a golden dove (from the collar) with a fleur-de-lis at the dove’s claws. The gold central medallion has a raised bust of Queen Salote Topou III, also  in gold. The dark-blue riband probably has the name of the order in gold capital letters, above the cross is a gold Tongan crown.

The Star is an 8-pointed silver, silver-gilt and enamel faceted star, with the collar badge superimposed in the centre (minus the crown).

Grand Cross 
The Star is an 8-pointed silver and enamel star, the collar badge is placed overall in the centre, the dove and the fleurs-de-lis are silver.

Commander 
The necklet badge is similar to the collar-badge except, that the central medallion is silver-gilt, the riband is dark-blue with the legend in gold capital letters, all suspended from a gold Tongan crown.

The necklet ribbon is sky-blue-ultramarine and approx. 41mm .

Member 
The breast badge is, as the Commander’s class, in silver and enamel (above, except smaller and the suspended crown is silver).

The breast ribbon is approximately 38 mm (as above).

Notable recipients

National recipients 
 King Tupou VI  (18.03.2012 - ) : Grand Master - Knight Grand Cross (31.7.2008) 
 Crown Prince Tupoutoʻa ʻUlukalala : Knight Grand Cross (31.7.2008) 
 Siosaʻia Maʻulupekotofa Tuita, 9th Tuita : Knight Grand Cross (31.7.2008) 
 Princess Mele Siu'ilikutapu Kalaniuvalu-Fotofili (Prince Sione Ngu's eldest daughter) : Dame Grand Cross with Collar (31.7.2008) 
 Kinikinilau Tuto'atasi, 7th Lord Fakafānua (Crown Princess' Father) : Knight Grand Cross (31.7.2008) 
 Queen Nanasipauʻu Tukuʻaho Dame Grand Cross with Collar (30.6.2015) 
 Queen Mother Halaevalu Mataʻaho ʻAhomeʻe : Dame Grand Cross 
 Princess  Salote Mafileʻo Pilolevu Tuita, The Princess Royal of Tonga : Dame Grand Cross with Collar  (31.7.2008)

Foreign recipients 
 Queen Elizabeth II of the United Kingdom : Dame Grand Cross (2012) 
 King Jigme Khesar Namgyel Wangchuck of the Kingdom of Bhutan : Knight Grand Cross (14.5.2010) 
 Empress Masako of the State of Japan : Dame Grand Cross (4.7.2015)

References

Orders, decorations, and medals of Tonga
Order of Queen Sālote Tupou III